Hadley Township is a civil township of Lapeer County in the U.S. state of Michigan. The population was 4,528 at the 2010 Census.

Communities 
 Cadyville was the area around a school house built in 1838. Starting in 1842, it had its own school district covering the southwest portion of the township, but was later absorbed by other school districts.
It was named for the nearby stream. John L. Morse purchased land here in 1833 and settled in 1834. Brother John and Henry M. Look also settled here in 1834. Morse became the first postmaster on January 3, 1836, and the office operated until September 30, 1903.
William Hart, Abraham Tunison, and Charles L. Cambell settled here in 1835. A post office opened on May 7, 1838, with John Mills, Jr. as the first postmaster. Circa 1907, Franklin Hadley became postmaster and for fifty years some member of the Hadley family held the office. The Hadley post office, with ZIP code 48440, provide P.O. box service to a small area within the township.
 The village of Metamora is to the east, and the Metamora post office, with ZIP code 48455, also serves much of northern and eastern Hadley Township.
 The city of Lapeer is to the north-northeast, and the Lapeer post office, with ZIP code 48446, also serves a small portion of northwestern Hadley Township.
 The village of Goodrich is to the west in Genesee County, and the Goodrich post office, with ZIP code 48438, also serves a portion of southwest Hadley Township.
 The village of Ortonville is to the south-southwest in Oakland County, and the Ortonville post office, with ZIP code 48462, also serves portions of southern Hadley Township.
 The village of Oxford is to the southeast in Oakland County, and the Oxford post office, with ZIP code 48371, also serves a small portion of southeast Hadley Township.

Geography

Demographics
As of the census of 2000, there were 4,655 people, 1,573 households, and 1,338 families residing in the township. The racial makeup of the township was 98.17% White, 0.04% African American, 0.28% Native American, 0.34% Asian, 0.24% from other races, and 0.92% from two or more races. Hispanic or Latino of any race were 1.14% of the population.

There were 1,573 households, out of which 39.6% had children under the age of 18 living with them, 77.5% were married couples living together, 3.8% had a female householder with no husband present, and 14.9% were non-families. 11.5% of all households were made up of individuals, and 3.2% had someone living alone who was 65 years of age or older.  The average household size was 2.95 and the average family size was 3.21.

In the township the population was spread out, with 28.0% under the age of 18, 6.6% from 18 to 24, 29.9% from 25 to 44, 28.3% from 45 to 64, and 7.2% who were 65 years of age or older.  The median age was 38 years. For every 100 females, there were 108.0 males.  For every 100 females age 18 and over, there were 107.7 males.

The median income for a household in the township was $72,381, and the median income for a family was $77,006. Males had a median income of $56,000 versus $36,328 for females. The per capita income for the township was $26,859.  About 1.3% of families and 1.4% of the population were below the poverty line, including 1.3% of those under age 18 and none of those age 65 or over.

Climate
This climatic region is typified by large seasonal temperature differences, with warm to hot (and often humid) summers and cold (sometimes severely cold) winters.  According to the Köppen Climate Classification system, Hadley has a humid continental climate, abbreviated "Dfb" on climate maps.

References

Notes

Sources

External links
 

Townships in Lapeer County, Michigan
Townships in Michigan